Pan American (often stylized as Pan•American) is an American experimental electronic music ensemble. It is the alter ego of Mark Nelson, vocalist and guitarist for the band Labradford, who first began recording under the name in 1997.

The debut release for Pan American was a self-titled LP on Kranky in 1998. The 2000 LP 360 Business/360 Bypass included appearances from Rob Mazurek and Alan Sparhawk and Mimi Parker of Low. Two further full-lengths on Kranky followed in 2002 and 2004.

Discography
Pan American (Kranky, 1998)
360 Business/360 Bypass (Kranky, 2000)
Personal Settings:Preset 1 (Quatermass Records, 2001)
East Coast Bugs EP (Quatermass Records, 2001)
Preset 1/3 (Quatermass, 2002)
The River Made No Sound (Kranky, 2002)
Quiet City (Kranky, 2004)
For Waiting, For Chasing (Mosz Records, 2006)
White Bird Release (Kranky, 2009)
Cloud Room, Glass Room (Kranky, 2013)
Rue Corridor (Sketch for Winter II) (Geographic North, 2015)
A Son (Kranky, 2019)
The Patience Fader (Kranky, 2022)

References

Experimental musical groups